Juan Carlos Revilla is an Anglican Bishop.

Revilla was consecrated in 2015 as an Auxiliary Bishop in Peru.

References

Anglican bishops of Peru
Living people
21st-century Anglican bishops in South America
Year of birth missing (living people)
Place of birth missing (living people)